Handžić is a Bosnian surname. Notable people with the surname include:
 Faris Handžić (born 1995), footballer
 Haris Handžić (born 1990), footballer
 Irfan Handžić (born 1956), retired footballer
 Mehmed Handžić (1906–1944), Islamic scholar

Bosnian surnames
Slavic-language surnames